Timothy Beck (born 2 January 1977 in Assen) is a Dutch sprinter. Together with Caimin Douglas, Patrick van Balkom and Troy Douglas he won a bronze medal in 4 x 100 metres relay at the 2003 World Championships in Athletics. With the same team he also participated at the 2004 Summer Olympics, but by a mistake in the changing area they did not advance from the series.

Beck also competed as a bobsledder in the 2002 Winter Olympics in Salt Lake City, where he finished in seventeenth position in the Four Men's Bob. He carried the Dutch flag at the opening ceremony of the 2010 Winter Olympics. He is of African-American descent.

Personal bests
60 metres –    6.71 (2004)
100 metres –  10.43 (2004)
200 metres –  21.54 (2003)

References

External links

1977 births
Living people
Dutch male sprinters
Dutch male bobsledders
Olympic athletes of the Netherlands
Olympic bobsledders of the Netherlands
Bobsledders at the 2002 Winter Olympics
Athletes (track and field) at the 2004 Summer Olympics
Bobsledders at the 2010 Winter Olympics
People from Assen
World Athletics Championships medalists
World Athletics Championships athletes for the Netherlands
Dutch sportspeople of Surinamese descent
Sportspeople from Drenthe